Chris Lieto (born February 7, 1972 in Red Bank, New Jersey) is a professional triathlete and the winner of the 2006 Ironman Japan, 2005 Ironman Canada, and 2002 Ironman Wisconsin triathlons.

Athletic career 
Lieto grew up in Danville, California and later began his athletic career playing collegiate water polo at Long Beach State University. In 1997, he saw the Hawaii Ironman Triathlon World Championship on television and decided to participate in his first triathlon ever, which he won. Only three years later he became a professional triathlete. Just another three years after that, in 2003, he went on to place 13th at that same championship he saw on television which sparked his interest in the sport.

After a disappointing race career in 2005, Lieto chose to return to work as a mortgage broker while still continuing to train. Lieto said that returning to work "...helped me balance the time and focus I put into triathlon. I still focus on training, but without the endless thinking about the next race or the next training day. It allows me to be a little more relaxed in my preparation for a race." Since 2003, Lieto has steadily worked up his finishing place at the Ironman World Championship: 13th in 2003, 18th in 2005, 9th in 2006, 6th in 2007, 18th in 2008 and 2nd overall in 2009. He is the current bike course record holder for the 2005 Ironman Canada, with a time of 4:25:26. K-Swiss is Lieto's primary sponsor.

Lieto currently resides in Kailua-Kona, Hawaii with his wife Karis, son Kaiden, and daughter Kayah.

Results 
2009 Results
2nd 	Ironman World Championships, Kona Hawaii 	
2nd 	Nautica Malibu Triathlon Classic 	
1st 	San Jose International Pro Challenge 	(course record)
2nd 	Ironman Boise 70.3 	(new bike course record)
2nd 	Ironman Hawaii Honu 70.3 	new bike course record
2nd 	UVAS Triathlon 	
7th 	Wildflower 1/2 Ironman 	
3rd 	Miami International Triathlon 	New Bike Course record

2008 Results
3rd 	Miami International Triathlon 	(bike course record)
1st 	Nautica South Beach 	(course record)
3rd 	Wildflower 1/2 Ironman 	(new bike course record)
1st 	Columbia Triathlon 	(course record)
1st 	San Jose International 	(course record)
2nd 	Ironman 70.3 Boise 	(bike course record)
23rd 	Ironman World Championships Hawaii 	
2nd 	Ironman Arizona

Additional Results
1st 	Ironman Japan 2006 	(new bike course record)
1st 	Ironman Canada 2005 	(new bike course record)
1st 	Ironman Wisconsin 2002 	
1st 	Ironman 70.3 Vineman 2002 	
1st 	Nautica Malibu Triathlon 2003 	
1st 	San Jose International 2007 	
2nd 	Ironman USA Lake Placid 2003 	
2nd 	Ironman Malaysia 2006 	(new bike course record)
2nd 	Ironman 70.3 Florida 2004 	
6th 	Ironman World Championship 2007 	
8th 	Ironman World Championship 70.3 2006 	(2nd American)
9th 	Ironman World Championship 2006, Kona Hawaii 	(1st American)
13th 	Ironman World Championship 2003 	
18th 	Ironman World Championship 2005 	
3rd     Kemah International Triathlon 2010    (new bike course record)
US National Ironman Champion 2003 	
Ranked 5th in the World 2003 by Inside Triathlon 

Chris is now retired from professional triathlon.

Notes

External links
 Official Website

American male triathletes
American people of Finnish descent
1972 births
Living people